Orwell Estuary is a 1,335.7 hectare biological Site of Special Scientific Interest which stretches along the River Orwell and its banks between Felixstowe and Ipswich in Suffolk. It is part of the Stour and Orwell Estuaries Ramsar site internationally important wetland site and Special Protection Area under the European Union Directive on the Conservation of Wild Birds. It is also in the Suffolk Coast and Heaths Area of Outstanding Natural Beauty.

The estuary is described by Natural England as of national importance for its breeding avocets, its other breeding and wintering birds, its vascular plants and its intertidal mud habitats. It also has a rich and diverse assemblage of invertebrates and a nationally important community of algae.

References

Sites of Special Scientific Interest in Suffolk
Ramsar sites in England